Iratsume is a monotypic butterfly genus in the family Lycaenidae. Its single species is Iratsume orsedice.

The larvae feed on Hamamelis japonica.

Subspecies
Iratsume orsedice suzukii (Sonan, 1940) Japan
Iratsume orsedice nosei Fujioka, 1996 Taiwan

References

Theclini
Lycaenidae genera
Monotypic butterfly genera